The following American politicians are members of the Democratic Socialists of America (DSA) and have held elected or appointed office in the United States. The DSA is a political nonprofit organization and not a political party, therefore DSA members usually run as members of the Democratic Party, Green Party, Working Families Party, or as independents.

In the 2017 elections, DSA members were elected to fifteen state and local offices.  In the 2018 midterm elections, DSA members Alexandria Ocasio-Cortez and Rashida Tlaib were elected to the United States House of Representatives and DSA members were elected to over forty state and local offices.  In the 2020 elections, DSA members Jamaal Bowman and Cori Bush were elected to the House and at least thirty-six DSA members won office, earning more than 3.1 million votes.

In 2021, DSA members largely took control of the Nevada Democratic Party, as the Las Vegas DSA-endorsed Progressive Slate won all five party positions in the party elections held that year. Four of the candidates on the winning slate are DSA members.

Federal officials

United States House of Representatives

Current (5)

Former (6)

State officials

Upper houses

Current (12)

Former (1)

Lower houses

Current (38)

Former (14)

Local officials

City councils and county commissions

Current (80)

Former (19)

Other local offices

Current (26)

Former (1)

See also 
 Chicago City Council Socialist Caucus
 List of socialist members of the United States Congress
 List of Communist Party USA members who have held office in the United States

Notes

References

Democratic Socialists of America